The 1908 Vanderbilt Commodores football team represented Vanderbilt University during the 1908 Southern Intercollegiate Athletic Association football season. The team's head coach was Dan McGugin, who served his fifth season in that capacity. Members of the Southern Intercollegiate Athletic Association (SIAA), the Commodores played eight home games in Nashville, Tennessee and finished the season with a record of 7–2–1 overall and 3–0–1 in SIAA.

On October 17, 1908 Vanderbilt played the school's 137th game, against Clemson. Winning the contest 41–0 for the schools' 100th victory.  
1908 was a down year for Vanderbilt with a wealth of sophomores; guided shrewdly by McGugin to its success.

Schedule

Season summary

Michigan

Before Vanderbilt played Michigan, Louis Hasslock had been on duty at Reelfoot Lake with a militia who were to guard against night riders.  When he learned he could be granted a leave of absence if he were to join his football team, he walked a distance of twenty miles through a country infested with night riders, and caught a train at Union City.

Tennessee

The Volunteers had compiled four wins in conference play. It was widely considered the best Tennessee football season up to that point. Vanderbilt won the match between the two schools 16 to 9.

Walker Leach made a 41-yard field goal to put the Vols up 4 to 0. "This seemed to arouse the local team" and Vanderbilt drove down the field for a touchdown. On a fake kick, Leach circled Vanderbilt's left end for 60 yards. Ray Morrison stopped him short of the goal. Nathan Dougherty was on Tennessee's squad.

Players

Varsity letter winners
"Wearers of the V."

Line

Backfield

References

Vanderbilt
Vanderbilt Commodores football seasons
Vanderbilt Commodores football